"Child Support" is a song written by Thom Schuyler, and recorded by American country music artist Barbara Mandrell.  It was released in July 1987 as the first single from the album Sure Feels Good.  The song reached number 13 on the Billboard Hot Country Singles & Tracks chart.

Chart performance

References

1987 singles
1987 songs
Barbara Mandrell songs
Songs written by Thom Schuyler
Song recordings produced by Tom Collins (record producer)
Capitol Records Nashville singles